is a former Japanese football player.

Playing career
Tabata was born in Saitama Prefecture on May 15, 1978. After graduating from high school, he joined his local club Urawa Reds in 1997. He played many matches as a center back from his first season. However, his opportunity to play decreased since 1998. In June 2001, he moved to JEF United Ichihara. However, he could hardly play in the matches. In 2003, he moved to J2 League club Consadole Sapporo. Although he could hardly play in the matches in 2003, he became a regular player as a defensive midfielder in 2004. His opportunity to play decreased in late 2005 and he retired end of the 2005 season.

Club statistics

References

External links

1978 births
Living people
Association football people from Saitama Prefecture
Japanese footballers
J1 League players
J2 League players
Urawa Red Diamonds players
JEF United Chiba players
Hokkaido Consadole Sapporo players
Association football defenders